Vaqueriza is a surname. Notable people with this surname include:

 Felipe Vaqueriza (born 1975), Spanish footballer
 José Antonio Santamaría Vaqueriza (1946–1993), Spanish footballer
 Trimido Vaqueriza (born 1929), Spanish rower